Vaishnavee is a 2018 Sri Lankan Sinhala drama thriller film directed by veteran director Sumitra Peries and produced by Mano Nanayakkara. The film stars Yashoda Wimaladharma, Thumindu Dodantenna and Jayalath Manoratne in lead roles along with Vasanthi Chathurani and Cletus Mendis. Popular teledrama actress Samadhi Arunachaya made her cinema debut with the film. The music is composed by Nimal Mendis, and is his last music direction before his death. The film was shot in 2012, and Sumitra Peries was the first director to shoot with the latest Red Epic camera in Sri Lanka. The film had the last script written by Tony Ranasinghe before his death.

The film received mostly positive reviews from critics. The film was released in 30 theaters throughout the country.

Plot
The story was influenced by veteran director Lester James Peries.

A puppeteer proposes to a girl but she runs away with another boy before their engagement. The sad puppeteer then carves a puppet in the shape of the girl of his dreams out of a tree where a goddess secretly lives. The puppet then turns alive with the soul of that goddess and falls in love with the puppeteer, but the fact that they are from two different worlds becomes a barrier to their relationship.

Cast
 Yashoda Wimaladharma as Vaishnavee, the Tree Goddess  
 Samadhi Arunachaya as Ruchira 
 Rohana Beddage as Gurunnanse
 Vasanthi Chathurani as Laxmi's mother
 Thumindu Dodantenna as Osanda 
 Shehara Hewadewa as Laxmi
 Jayalath Manoratne as Ruchira's Father 
 Mahendra Perera as Simon
 Roshan Pilapitiya as Laxmi's Lover
 Iranganie Serasinghe as Osanda's grandmother
 Cletus Mendis as Boatman
 Thesara Jayawardane as Laxmi's friend
 Veena Jayakody as Guru Maniyo

Songs
The film contains two songs. Melodies are by Nimal Mendis and music coordination by Suresh Maliyadde.

References

External links
 
 ‘වෛෂ්ණාවී’ සිනමා විමසුම
 වෛෂ්ණාවී සමඟ එන තෙසාරා ජයවර්ධන

2018 films
2010s Sinhala-language films
2018 thriller drama films
Sri Lankan drama films